The R378 is a Regional Route in South Africa that connects Vryburg with Bray, North West via Terra Firma.

Its north-western origin is the R375 at Bray. It heads roughly south-east, through Tosca to meet the south-eastern origin of the R378. The route maintains a south-easterly direction, through Crafthole and Ganyesa to end at Vryburg at the N14.

External links
 Routes Travel Info

References

Regional Routes in North West (South African province)